Sar Sakhti-ye Bala (also Romanized as Sar Sakhtī-ye Bālā; also known as Sabz Sanakhtī ‘Olyā, Sar Sakheī, Sarsakhleh, Sarsakhtīyeh, Sar Sakhtī-ye ‘Olyā, and Sarsakteh) is a village in Astaneh Rural District, in the Central District of Shazand County, Markazi Province, Iran. At the 2006 census, its population was 726, in 259 families.

References 

Populated places in Shazand County